The 2022–23 West Virginia Mountaineers women's basketball team represented West Virginia University during the 2022–23 NCAA Division I women's basketball season. The Mountaineers are coach by first-year head coach Dawn Plitzuweit, played their home games at WVU Coliseum and are members of the Big 12 Conference.

Previous season
The Mountaineers finished the season 15–15, 7–11 in Big 12 play to finish in seventh place. In the Big 12 Tournament, they defeated TCU in the first round, before losing to Iowa State in the quarterfinals. They were not invited to the NCAA tournament or the WNIT.

Offseason

Departures

Incoming

Recruiting

Recruiting class of 2023

Roster

Schedule and results
Source:

|-
!colspan=12 style=| Exhibition

|-
!colspan=12 style=| Non-conference regular season

|-
!colspan=9 style=""| Big 12 regular season

|-
!colspan=12 style=| Big 12 Tournament

|-
!colspan=12 style=| NCAA Tournament

Rankings

The Coaches Poll did not release a Week 2 poll and the AP Poll did not release a poll after the NCAA Tournament.

References

West Virginia Mountaineers women's basketball
West Virginia
West Virginia Mountaineers women's basketball
West Virginia Mountaineers women's basketball
West Virginia